Beaurepaires is an Australian and New Zealand tyre retail and repair chain started in 1922 by Frank Beaurepaire, a former Olympic swimmer for Australia and Australasia, with money he received for rescuing a shark attack victim from the water at Sydney.

Beaurepaires is a subsidiary of Goodyear and Dunlop Tyres Australia.

Logo

Marketing
From 2018, Beaurepaires sponsored DJR Team Penske in the Supercars Championship. In 2019, Beaurepaires became the title sponsor of the Supercars Championship event the Melbourne 400, a support event to the Australian Grand Prix.

The New Zealand chain is also noted for TV commercials featuring Australian actor Vince Martin as a spokesperson, which he has appeared for more than 25 years, particularly the (singing) Christmas commercials and the simplistic "This is a spoon" advert.

References

External links
 Company website – Australia
 Company website – New Zealand

Australian companies established in 1922
Automotive companies of Australia
Automotive companies of New Zealand
Service companies of Australia
Australian subsidiaries of foreign companies